Oelandia is an extinct genus of basal molluscs of the family helcionellid from the Middle Cambrian of Sweden, China and North America.  It has a small, upwards-pointing anterior snorkel with a closed end. It bears pronounced concentric ribbing around its strongly coiled exogastric shell.

References

Cambrian molluscs
Fossils of Sweden